Sandian (also Romanized as Sandīān; also known as Sandīsān Bāzār) is a village in Dinachal Rural District, Pareh Sar District, Rezvanshahr County, Gilan Province, Iran. At the 2006 census, its population was 519, in 142 families.

References 

Populated places in Rezvanshahr County